We're a Winner is an album by the American soul music group the Impressions, released in 1968. It was the group's last album for ABC Records; they moved on to Curtis Mayfield's Curtom Records.

Track listing
All tracks composed by Curtis Mayfield; except where indicated. "We're Rolling On" Parts 1 and 2 are bonus tracks added for the 1994 and 2007 CD reissues of this album.
 "We're a Winner" – 2:25     
 "Moonlight Shadows" – 3:11     
 "Let Me Tell the World" – 3:16       
 "I'm Gettin Ready" (Mayfield, Phil Upchurch) – 2:31      
 "Nothing Can Stop Me" – 3:16      
 "No One to Love" – 2:31      
 "Little Brown Boy" – 2:44      
 "I Loved and I Lost" – 2:31      
 "Romancing to the Folk Song" – 2:35       
 "Up, Up and Away" (Jimmy Webb) – 3:17   
 "We're Rolling On, Part 1"      
 "We're Rolling On, Part 2"

Personnel 
 Curtis Mayfield – lead vocals, guitar
 Fred Cash – backing vocals
 Sam Gooden – backing vocals
 The Funk Brothers – instrumentation
 Johnny Pate – producer, conductor, arranger

Charts

References

1968 albums
The Impressions albums
Albums produced by Johnny Pate
MCA Records albums
Universal Records albums